Huantán District is one of thirty-three districts of the province Yauyos in Peru.

Geography 
The Cordillera Central traverses the district. Other mountains are listed below:

See also 
 Qaqa Mach'ay

References